Heart of Gold may refer to:

Film and television
 A Heart of Gold, a 1915 American silent romantic drama short film
 Heart of Gold (1923 film), a Spanish silent film directed by Manuel Noriega 
 Heart of Gold (1941 film), a Spanish comedy directed by Ignacio F. Iquino 
 Neil Young: Heart of Gold, a 2006 documentary and concert film by Jonathan Demme
Hearts of Gold, a BBC television series presented by Esther Rantzen

Television episodes
 "Heart of Gold" (Firefly)
 "Heart of Gold" (Instant Star)
 "Heart of Gold" (Mysticons)
 "Heart of Gold" (Once Upon a Time)

Literature 
 Heart of Gold (novel), a 2000 novel by Sharon Shinn
 Heart of Gold, a 1975 novel by Russell H. Greenan
 Heart of Gold, a 2007 novel by Michael Pryor

Music 
 Heart of Gold (album), a 1988 album by Sofia Rotaru
 "Heart of Gold" (Neil Young song) (1972)
 "Heart of Gold" (The Kinks song) (1983)
 "Heart of Gold" (Johnny Hates Jazz song) (1987)
 "Heart of Gold" (Force & Styles song) (1998)
 "Heart of Gold" (BQL song) (2017)
 "Heart of Gold", a song by Ashlyne Huff
 "Heart of Gold", a song by James Blunt from Some Kind of Trouble
 Heart of Gold Band, a band formed by former Grateful Dead members Keith and Donna Jean Godchaux
 Heart of Gold Records, an American record label

Other uses
 Heart of Gold, a fictional spaceship in The Hitchhiker's Guide to the Galaxy franchise
 Heart of Gold, a proposed name for a cargo flight in the SpaceX Mars transportation infrastructure

See also
 Hooker with a heart of gold, a literary archetype